Whitewater Ski Resort is a ski resort in western Canada, located a 25-minute drive from Nelson in southern British Columbia. In the Selkirk Mountains, the resort is situated in Ymir bowl, beneath the  Ymir Mountain.

While Ymir Peak is not included within the ski area boundary, lifts climb both shoulders of the bowl and provide easy traverse routes along ridges to the top. In addition to its snow, the resort is renowned for its tree skiing and steep runs; only 20% of the runs are beginner, while 40% are intermediate and the remaining 40% are advanced. Areas surrounding Whitewater, including West Arm Provincial Park, are renowned for easy access for backcountry split boarding and ski touring.

Lifts and terrain 
The resort consists of three lifts: one triple chairlift (installed in 2010), one antiquated double chair, a fixed grip quad chair (installed in 2017), a handle tow,  of Nordic trails, and a lodge with an award-winning cafeteria, a rental shop and guest services.

The Summit Chairlift accesses the south ridge of Ymir bowl, and offers a wide variety of gladed blue and black runs.  The Silverking Double chair runs up the north ridge of Ymir bowl, and provides access to the resorts only beginner runs.  The Summit lift was purchased from the Spokane world fair, while the Silver King was purchased from Whistler, where it had previously been the Olive chair.  From the top of either chair, skiers who are properly equipped can traverse the ridges towards Ymir Peak, and then choose from a multitude of lines that lead back to the base area.

The triple-seat fixed-grip Glory Ridge chair vertically rises  in eleven minutes, opening up the Backside area, doubling the resort's boundaries. It added  of advanced and intermediate ski terrain to the existing , for a total area of  skiable terrain. Along with the construction of the lift, much of the surrounding area was logged to create more open and skiable glades. Built by Doppelmayr, this lift was originally installed in Colorado at Vail in 1980 as its High Noon lift.

Because of its steep terrain and plentiful snow, Whitewater is frequented by many back country skiers; this situation however, creates a significant avalanche hazard, and avalanche control is among the company's largest expenditures.

History 
Skiing began in Nelson in 1932, with the Silver King Skiers, following Danny McKay's success in the National ski jumping contests. In 1974, a coalition of locals residents backed the creation of a new resort in a more suitable location. Ymir bowl was chosen, and Whitewater Resort opened in 1976.

On August 8, 2008, it was announced that Knee Deep Development Corp. purchased Whitewater Ski Resort from owners Mike and Shelley Adams.

Glory Ridge, Whitewater's first new chairlift in 17 years, began operating in 2010 on December 24. Pre-owned and formerly at Vail, it opened easy access to what was previously back-country terrain and vastly decreasing lift lineups.

Expansions 

The base facilities were installed over 30 years ago and usage levels of existing facilities were often above comfortable capacity, especially on heavy snowfall days and traditional holidays. In 2002 Whitewater Ski Resort announced a plan for expansion and improvement. Named the Master Plan, the plan was proposed in 2002, accepted by the Ministry of Tourism, Culture and Arts (MTCA) in 2007, and modified in 2010 by the Knee Deep Development Corporation who purchased the resort two years earlier.

The revised plan includes 3 chairs up Backside, one up White Queen, a Sherpa Ridge lift and a quad chair. The plan is expected to increase White Water's downhill comfortable carrying capacity (CCC) from its current 1,106 to 5,000 skiers/riders.

See also 
 List of ski areas and resorts in Canada

References

External links 
 

Ski areas and resorts in British Columbia
Selkirk Mountains
West Kootenay
1976 establishments in British Columbia